The Motor City Collection is a box set by Australian pop vocal group Human Nature, which was issued on 19 April 2008 and peaked at No. 18 on the ARIA Albums Chart. It comprises three CDs of cover versions by the band of Motown artists' material and a live DVD.

The box set was released to coincide with a performance by Human Nature with Mary Wilson of the Supremes on the TV show It Takes Two on 22 April 2008. It includes the complete set of Human Nature's successful Motown trilogy, the three #1 albums, Reach Out, Dancing in the Street and Get Ready as well as their #1 DVD Reach Out – Live at the Capitol.

Track listing

Disc 1; Reach Out: The Motown Record
Reach Out I'll Be There
You Keep Me Hangin' On
Baby I Need Your Loving
If You Don't Know Me By Now
I Heard It Through The Grapevine
Twenty-five Miles
I'll Be There
My Girl
I Want You Back
Stop! In The Name of Love
You Are Every Thing
The Tracks of My Tears

Disc 2; Dancing in the Street: the Songs of Motown II
Dancing in the Street
Ain't No Mountain High Enough
ABC
Signed, Sealed, Delivered I'm Yours
You Can't Hurry Love
Ain't To Proud To Beg
What's Going On
Uptight (Every Thing's Alright)
Please Mr. Postman
I Can't Get Next To You
Midnight Train To Georgia
I Can't Help Myself (Sugar Pie, Honey Bunch)
What Becomes of the Broken Hearted
Just My Imagination (Running Away With Me)

Disc 3; Get Ready
Get Ready (with Smokey Robinson)
River Deep Mountain High (with Mary Wilson of the Supremes)
The Way You Do The Things You Do (with The Temptations)
Ain't Nothing Like The Real Thing
It Takes Two (with Mary Wilson of the Supremes)
Easy
Do You Love Me
Tears of a Clown (with Smokey Robinson)
It's The Same Old Song
How Sweet It Is (To Be Loved By You)
(I Know) I'm Losing You
(Love Is Like A) Heatwave (with Martha Reeves)
I'm Gonna Make You Love Me
Ooo Baby Baby
Jingle Bells [Bonus Christmas Track]

Disc 4 (DVD); Reach Out: Live at the Capital
Dancing in the Street
You Keep Me Hangin' On
Baby I Need Your Loving
I Heard It Through The Grapevine
If You Don't Know Me By Now
How Sweet It Is (To Be Loved By You)
Stop! In The Name of Love
You Are Every Thing
Every Time You Cry
Wishes
Tellin' Everybody
When You Say You Love Me
People Get Ready
I Want You Back
I Can't Help Myself (Sugar Pie, Honey Bunch)
What's Going On
The Tracks of My Tears
My Girl
I'll Be There
ABC
I Can't Get Next To You
Uptight (Every Thing's Alright)
Twenty-five Miles
Ain't No Mountain High Enough
Reach Out I'll Be There

Charts

References

Human Nature (band) albums
2008 compilation albums
2008 live albums
2008 video albums
Live video albums
Covers albums
Compilation albums by Australian artists